Victor Havrylovych Batiuk  (15 March 1939 – 2 December 1996) was a Ukrainian diplomat and poet, who has served as Ambassador Extraordinary and Plenipotentiary of Ukraine, and Permanent Representative of Ukraine to the United Nations. He was the only one who knew Bengali and translated Rabindranath Tagore into Ukrainian.

Early life and education 
Born in 1939 in Sverdlovskaja Oblast, Batiuk graduated from Moscow State Institute of International Relations. He was fluent in Bengali, English, Russian and French.

Professional career and experience 

He worked with the Ministry of Foreign Affairs of the Ukrainian SSR participated in the translation section of the Writer's Union of Ukraine, which maintained relations with Vasyl Stus.

He worked as Second Secretary Permanent Mission of the Ukrainian SSR to the United Nations.

In 1978-1984 - Permanent Representative of Ukraine to the United Nations Office at Geneva;

In 1984-1992 - Head of Department of International Organizations, Ministry of Foreign Affairs of the Ukrainian SSR.

In 1986 - he was members of the delegation of the Ukrainian SSR at the special session of the UN General Assembly on Namibia.

In 1991 - he was the Ukrainian SSR member delegation to the 46th session of the UN General Assembly

In 1992-1993 - Permanent Representative of Ukraine to the United Nations;

In 1994-1996 - Ambassador Extraordinary and Plenipotentiary of Ukraine in Canada.

In 1996 he was killed in a car accident.

Avtor 
 Ukraine's non-nuclear option / Victor Batiouk by Batiuk, V. H New York : United Nations, 1992
 Poliusy : poezii / [avtor] Viktor Batiuk by Batiuk, Viktor Havrylovych Kyiv : Molod, 1971

Diplomatic rank 
 Ambassador Extraordinary and Plenipotentiary of Ukraine.

References

External links 
 Chronology of Ukraine-Canada Relations
 Sarasota Herald-Tribune - Jul 12, 1993
 Ukrainian-Canadian Co-operation
 Ukraine's new ambossador to the U.N. pledges to strengthen independence
 “What do You Need that Language for?”

1939 births
1996 deaths
Ambassadors of Ukraine to Canada
Permanent Representatives of Ukraine to the United Nations
People from Chelyabinsk Oblast
Ukrainian translators
Ukrainian poets
20th-century poets
20th-century translators